This article is about the particular significance of the year 1805 to Wales and its people.

Incumbents
Lord Lieutenant of Anglesey – Henry Paget 
Lord Lieutenant of Brecknockshire and Monmouthshire – Henry Somerset, 6th Duke of Beaufort
Lord Lieutenant of Caernarvonshire – Thomas Bulkeley, 7th Viscount Bulkeley
Lord Lieutenant of Cardiganshire – Thomas Johnes
Lord Lieutenant of Carmarthenshire – John Vaughan (until 19 January); George Rice, 3rd Baron Dynevor (from 21 April)  
Lord Lieutenant of Denbighshire – Sir Watkin Williams-Wynn, 5th Baronet    
Lord Lieutenant of Flintshire – Robert Grosvenor, 1st Marquess of Westminster 
Lord Lieutenant of Glamorgan – John Stuart, 1st Marquess of Bute 
Lord Lieutenant of Merionethshire - Sir Watkin Williams-Wynn, 5th Baronet
Lord Lieutenant of Montgomeryshire – Edward Clive, 1st Earl of Powis
Lord Lieutenant of Pembrokeshire – Richard Philipps, 1st Baron Milford
Lord Lieutenant of Radnorshire – George Rodney, 3rd Baron Rodney

Bishop of Bangor – William Cleaver
Bishop of Llandaff – Richard Watson
Bishop of St Asaph – Samuel Horsley 
Bishop of St Davids – Thomas Burgess

Events
21 October - Battle of Trafalgar: A British Royal Navy fleet led by Admiral Horatio Nelson defeats a combined French and Spanish fleet off the coast of Spain. About 465 of the 18,000 men on the British ships were born in Wales.
26 November - The Ellesmere Canal's Pontcysyllte Aqueduct is opened, the tallest and longest in Britain, completing the canal's Llangollen branch.
unknown dates
John Kenrick III develops his great-uncle's chandlery at Wrexham into a bank.
Alban Thomas Jones-Gwynne builds the town of Aberaeron.

Arts and literature

New books
Thomas Charles - Geiriadur Ysgrythyrol
Theophilus Jones - History of the County of Brecknock, vol. 1
Titus Lewis - A Welsh — English Dictionary, Geiriadur Cymraeg a Saesneg
Robert Southey - Madoc

Music
Edward Jones (Bardd y Brenin) takes up residence in St James's Palace.

Visual arts
English watercolour landscape painter David Cox makes his first tour in Wales.

Births
13 December - Robert Griffiths, inventor (died 1883)
19 December - John David Edwards, hymn-writer (died 1885)
date unknown
Evan Davies, missionary (died 1864)
Hugh Hughes (Tegai), writer (died 1864)
John William Thomas, mathematician (died 1840)

Deaths
15 April - Mary Morgan, servant, 16 (executed by hanging, for killing her newborn child)
August - Ann Griffiths, poet and hymn-writer, 29
25 November - Jonathan Hughes, poet, 84

References

 
 Wales